Catherine Fisher (born 1957) is a prize-winning Welsh poet and children's novelist. She has also worked as a school and university teacher. She lives in the city of Newport, Wales.

Work experience
Catherine Fisher has worked as a primary-school teacher and as an archaeologist. She also taught writing for children at the University of Glamorgan.

Writing
Fisher has published four poetry collections with Seren Books: Immrama (1988), The Unexplored Ocean (c. 1994), Altered States (1999) and The Bramble King (2019). She has also published a pamphlet, Folklore (2003), with Smith/Doorstop Books, and many poems in magazines and anthologies. The collection Immrama won the Welsh Arts Council Young Writers' Prize in 1989. She won the Cardiff International Poetry Competition in the same year with her poem 'Marginalia'.

Since the late 1980s, Fisher has been writing children's fantasy. Her novels of this kind have been translated into over 30 languages, and many of her works have won or been shortlisted for literary awards. She has twice won the Welsh Books Council Tir na n'Og prize for fiction in English, with The Candle Man (2000) and The Clockwork Crow (2015) Her young adult fantasies Incarceron and Sapphique were New York Times bestsellers and Times Book of the Year. The Oracle, the first volume of a trilogy mixing Egyptian and Greek myth, was shortlisted for the Whitbread Prize. The Clockwork Crow, first of an acclaimed trilogy for middle grade, was shortlisted for the Blue Peter Prize. Fisher's work mixes myth, legend and folktale, with vibrant characters and language that is precise and evocative.

Bibliography

Poetry
Immrama (1988) Seren Books
The Unexplored Ocean (1994)Seren Books
Altered States (1999) Seren Books
Folklore (2003) Seren Books
The Bramble King (2019) Seren Books.

Prose
The Conjuror's Game (1990) The Bodley Head
Fintan's Tower (1991)      The Bodley Head
Saint Tarvel's Bell (1992)
The Snow-Walker trilogy: 
The Snow-Walker's Son (1993) The Bodley Head
The Empty Hand (1995)        The Bodley Head 
The Soul Thieves (1996)      The Bodley Head
The Candle Man (1994.)
The Hare And Other Stories (1994) Pont books
Belin's Hill (1997)
The Book of the Crow series:  (US title: Relic Master series)
The Relic Master (1998) (US title:  The Dark City, 2011)
The Interrex (1999) (US title:  The Lost Heiress, 2011)
Flain's Coronet (2000) (US title:  The Hidden Coronet, 2011)
The Margrave (2001) (US title:  The Margrave, 2011)
The Lammas Field (1999)
Darkwater Hall (2000)
Corbenic (2002)
The Oracle trilogy:
The Oracle (US title: The Oracle Betrayed, 2003)
The Archon (US title: The Sphere of Secrets, 2004)
The Scarab (US title: Day of the Scarab, 2005)
Darkhenge (2005)
The Weather Dress (2005)
Incarceron series
Incarceron (January 2010, 2007 in UK)
Sapphique (December 2010, 8 UK)
Crown of Acorns (May 2010)
Chronoptika series
Obsidian Mirror (2012)
The Box of Red Brocade (US title: Slanted Worlds, 2013)
The Door in the Moon (2015)
The Speed of Darkness (2016)
The Clockwork Crow (2018)
The Velvet Fox (2019)
The Midnight Swan (2020)
The Red Gloves and Other Stories (2021)

Awards and nominations
1995, The Candle Man won Best English-Language Book at the Tir na n-Og Awards
2003, The Oracle shortlisted for the Whitbread Children's Book Award
2003, The Oracle nominated for the Bram Stoker Award for Best Work for Young Readers
2007, Corbenic won the Mythopoeic Fantasy Award for Children's Literature
2019, The Clockwork Crow nominated for Blue Peter Book Award, won the English-language Tir na n-Og Award

References

Pollinger Limited page on Catherine (accessed 24 August 2006).

External links

Catherine Fisher at Fantastic Fiction
Catherine Fisher profile at BBC Wales

1957 births
Living people
20th-century Welsh poets
21st-century Welsh poets
20th-century Welsh novelists
21st-century Welsh novelists
20th-century Welsh women writers
21st-century Welsh women writers
21st-century Welsh writers
Welsh children's writers
British women children's writers
Welsh fantasy writers
Academics of the University of Glamorgan
People from Newport, Wales
Date of birth missing (living people)
Women science fiction and fantasy writers
Welsh women poets
Welsh archaeologists
British women archaeologists
British pamphleteers
Welsh women novelists